Kaappaan is a 2019 Indian Tamil-language action thriller film directed by K. V. Anand and written by Pattukkottai Prabakar. It was produced by Lyca Productions and stars Suriya, Mohanlal and Arya with Sayyeshaa, Samuthirakani, Poorna, Boman Irani and Chirag Jani in supporting roles.

The narrative revolves around Kathiravan, a Special Protection Group (SPG) officer who struggles to protect the Prime Minister from a mysterious man who threatens to assassinate him.

The film was released theatrically on 20 September 2019 and received mixed reviews from critics. Despite this, it was a commercial success, grossing 100 crore at the box office. It was the final directorial work of K. V. Anand, before his death on 30 April 2021.

Plot 
  
The terrorists attempt to assassinate the PM, Chandrakanth Varma, in New Delhi. The event security services learn about this, and the attack is started when the PM arrives. The PM is saved and sent to his office. The Government thwarts the attempt with NSG operations on Varma's direct orders. Unfortunately, the Union Minister for Communications, Vasudev is killed as collateral damage, whose deceased's daughter is Anjali, the PM's junior office secretary.

In Thanjavur, Kathiravan "Kathir", is an organic farmer who also moonlights as a special agent working for the country's military intelligence. The captured terrorist reveals another plot to assassinate the PM during his visit to London. The SPG seek Kathir's help to protect the PM in London, and Kathir is able to identify and shoot the suspect. Anjali mistakes Kathir for the assassin and tails him, but he tricks her into getting drunk and shakes her off. Varma then leaves for India, only to find that the Indian soldiers in Kashmir were killed by the Pakistani army. Rajan Mahadev is a business tycoon and public figure, who meets with Varma and secretly discusses about methods of retaliation. 

While celebrating Kathir's coworker and friend, Joseph and his wife Priya's wedding anniversary, Joseph gets a murder threat, and his pet cat is fatally shot. Kathir and Joseph track the mysterious caller, but he diverts them with a mini bomb blast and escapes. Meanwhile, Varma leaves for Kashmir to address the public. A mysterious caller tampers with the SPG's communication system and points to a bomb on the stage where Varma is present. Kathir locates the explosive and throws it away without any casualties. Varma is moved to his convoy, but the caller uses this scuffle to detonate yet another bomb planted in Varma's car, killing him instantly. Aftermath of Varma's untimely demise, there is a power struggle for the successor to the PM's position. Varma's advisor chooses Varma's son, Abhishek "Abhi" Chandrakanth Varma, to be the next PM to avoid a political split. 

Now suspended for being unable to protect the PM, Kathir returns to the crime scene and finds an abandoned house in the vicinity, which is revealed to be the place where the killer had been. Joseph and the forensic team find evidence and match it to their friend Ranjith, a disgraced double agent in the SPG. Ranjith is now out for vengeance on Varma and the SPG because of his prior arrest resulting in his family's suicide. Meanwhile, the farmers are rioting against the construction of mines in Thanjavur, since it is destroying their agriculture. Abhishek plans to shut down the mines but is resisted by Mahadev, who owns them, and the two get into a political cold war. Abhishek takes Anjali out on her birthday, despite security warnings and a murder attempt is made on him, where Anjali injures her arm. Kathir and Joseph save Abhishek, but while escaping, Joseph is mortally wounded and dies. 

During the post-mortem, Kathir finds that one of his officers, Prem, has tried to tamper with the evidence. Prem reveals himself as a double agent, who is in cahoots with Ranjith, and was the one who killed Joseph while he was rescuing Abhishek. Meanwhile, the fields in Thanjavur have suddenly infested with male caelifera locusts. It was orchestrated by Mahadev, since the farmers didn't give up their land for his mining company. Mahadev also happens to be the brain behind Varma's assassination, and Ranjith and Prem are merely his puppets. Abhishek and Mahadev discuss about this ongoing feud and make a deal that in the immediate press conference, Mahadev will agree to shutting down his mines in Thanjavur. Mahadev seemingly agrees, but secretly plans to release both male and female caelifera, which will ensure the destruction of the crops without any chances of revival, and his mining company can be established without further problems. 

Kathir figures this out and destroys the train in which the locusts are being transported. At the press conference, Ranjith gains entry to the control room and plans to kill Abhishek on Mahadev's orders. Kathir beats up Ranjith, who reveals that the bomb is with Anjali. She is called to the control room, and they find that the cast on her broken arm contains the bomb. Anjali's cast is removed, and the bomb is disposed. Furthermore, Ranjith also says that Kathir's jacket has a bomb and removing it will cause it to detonate. With Kathir frozen on the spot, Ranjith and Mahadev escape and enter the latter's car and detonates the bomb, but the bomb explodes in the car, thus killing Mahadev and Ranjith on the spot, where it is revealed that Kathir had found the bomb in the jacket earlier and had disposed the jacket in Mahadev's car.

Cast 

Suriya as Kathiravan (Kathir), an Organic Farmer, SPG Commando, later PM's Principal Security Advisor & Anjali's love interest 
Mohanlal as Chandrakanth Varma, Prime Minister of India
Arya as Abhishek (Abhi) Varma, Son of Chandrakanth, later Prime Minister of India
Sayyeshaa as Anjali Vasudev, PM's Press Secretary (Kathir's love interest)
Samuthirakani as Joseph Selvaraj, SPG Director
Poorna as Priya  Joseph Selvaraj, Joseph's wife 
Boman Irani as Rajan Mahadev, industrialist.
Chirag Jani as Ranjith Kumar, former intelligence agent.
Prem as Prem, SPG Commando
Kiran as Vivek, SPG Commando 
Uma as Mrs. Varma, Chandrakanth's wife
Thalaivasal Vijay as Santhosh, Cabinet Secretary 
Paruthiveeran Sujatha as Kathiravan's mother
Shankar Krishnamurthy as Sundhar
Nagineedu as Sikander, Defense Minister 
Swaminathan as Ramanujam
Mayilswamy as Delhi police inspector Abhishek Nagar
Ravi Prakash as Shiva, Mahadev's assistant
Manoj Lulla as Manoj
R. N. R. Manohar as Member of Parliament 
 Anitha Sampath as Newsreader Kavitha
Pattukkottai Prabakar in a special appearance as a journalist
M. S. Prabhu in a special appearance as Kashmir collector
Anthony in a special appearance as Irfan, interrogation officer 
Nikitha Harris Jayaraj in a special appearance in the song "Vinnil Vinmeen"
Danielle Haden as an item number in the song "Machan Inga Vandhira"

Production 
Principal photography of the film commenced on 25 June 2018,in London. Arya replaced Allu Sirish who opted out of the film due to scheduling conflicts, making his first collaboration with Suriya. The film was shot on multiple locations at various places across the world including New York, Brazil, New Delhi and Hyderabad. It was referred to, colloquially, by the media as Suriya 37 as it is the thirty-seventh film to star Suriya. The film also marks Boman Irani's Tamil debut. Amitabh Bachchan was approached for a role as the Prime Minister of India, but later Mohanlal was roped in.

Initially, Gavemic U. Ary of Jigarthanda fame was announced as the cinematographer of the film, but in a turn of events Abhinandan Ramanujam replaces him. Later, cinematographer Ramanujam left the project after the first schedule, apparently due to scheduling conflicts with cinematography commitments for Malayalam film 9. Subsequently, M. S. Prabhu who previously collaborate with Suriya and director Anand for the film Ayan was assigned as cinematographer.

Also, it was revealed that Harris Jayaraj, Anthony and D. R. K. Kiran was assigned as music director, film editor and art director, respectively, continuing their association with the director from his previous films.

The makers had registered three titles: Kaappaan, Meetpaan and Uyirkaa, and asked fans to choose what title to name the film through a poll. Although the majority of fans voted for Uyirkaa, on 31 December 2018, Lyca Productions announced the film's title as Kaappaan.

The movie shot a song sequence on Indonesia's Java island. Director K.V Anand shared the news via Twitter. It was also reported that Mohanlal would play the Indian Prime Minister, and Suriya is said to play a high-ranking security officer.

Soundtrack
The soundtrack album is scored by Harris Jayaraj in his fifth collaboration with director K. V. Anand. On July 21, the audio launch event of  Kaappaan was held in Chennai in a grand manner. It was a star-studded affair that saw the likes of Rajinikanth, director Shankar, and lyricist Vairamuthu attend the event. Harris' daughter Karen Nikita Harris has made her debut as a singer with this film, lending her voice to the song 'Vinnil Vinmeen'.

Upon release, the album received a positive review from Firstpost, commenting that "Harris Jayraj composes yet another album loaded with chartbusters for Suriya's film. Dipped in quintessential Harris signature, the album offers different styles of music, ending up with different results." Suriya and Harris Jayaraj have collaborated for the 9th time through this film.

Release
On 31 December 2018, Lyca Productions announced the film's title as Kaappaan, following by two first look posters released on the New Year's Day, 1 January 2019. The teaser for the film was released, coinciding  with the Tamil New Year on 14 April 2019. Initially, the makers announced that the film is scheduled to release on 30 August 2019, but considering the release of Saaho, which is scheduled on the same date, the release was pushed to 20 September 2019. The first trailer of the film was released on the YouTube channel of the production company on 4 September 2019, followed by the second trailer, which was released on 14 September 2019. A Telugu dubbed version titled Bandobast was released simultaneously with the Tamil version. Kaappaan earned 88.75 crore as pre-release business.

Reception

Critical reception 
The film received positive reviews from audience, and mixed reviews from critics. Behindwoods rated 2.5 out of 5 stars and stated, "Kaappaan is a watchable commercial drama and action treat to Suriya fans, that has some good engaging moments". The Times of India rated 2 out of 5 stars stating "KV Anand's Kaappaan feels like one of those patriotic films that Vijayakanth and Arjun frequently made in the 90s, but is not as entertaining as those". Sify rated 2 out of 5 stars stating "Ambitious but exhausting!". News18 rated 1 out of 5 stars and stated "Despite Stellar Star Cast, Suriya-Mohanlal Starrer Loses Focus". Firstpost rated 2.25 out of 5 stars stating "Suriya, Mohanlal are charismatic in this formulaic action drama". The Hindu stated, "KV Anand's latest collaboration with his favourite leading man is a painstakingly long thriller, that neither has soul nor brain". IndiaGlitz rated 2.5 out of 5 stars stating "Interesting premise, let down by a predictable, dull screenplay." The New Indian Express rated 1.5 out of 5 stars stating "Never do you truly believe that this film has a real understanding of the world and its politics." The Indian Express rated 1 out of 5 stars stating "KV Anand fills Kaappaaan with props, in his never-ending endeavour to create that elusive surreal ambience. But the film has artificiality written all over." Deccan Chronicle rated 2.5 out of 5 stars stating "Kaappaan plays a big game and is very commercial in nature." Nettv4u rated 3 out of 5 stars stating "The racy thriller with power-packed performances and the high-octane action sequences is sure to win the hearts. Suriya is definitely back on his track, after a few average films. Kaappaan... is really a Kaappaan for LYCA, Suriya and KV Anand." The News Minute rated 2 out of 5 stars stating "Other than Suriya, nobody in the SPG looks like they've even slow jogged on the treadmill, let alone performed miraculous high security ops." The Week rated 2 out of 5 stars stating "The predictable screenplay, which reminds you of some old Vijayakanth or Arjun films, is disappointing as it comes from Anand who has had some decent outings with Suriya earlier, like Maattraan and Ayan." MovieCrow rated 3.25 stars out of 5 stating "Suriya delivers his charismatic Best as SPG agent."

Box office 
In its opening weekend, the film collected  in Tamil Nadu, which at the time made it one of the highest-grossing opening weekends in Tamil film history. The film collected approximately  worldwide in its first weekend. According to the film's producers, Kaappaan earned around  worldwide. The film was a commercial success and emerged profitable for its makers.

Legacy
An internet meme began trending on social media platforms in late May 2020, in which Suriya's films were coincided with real life incidents, that happened around the world. Here, locust attack, was predicted in the film.

References

External links 
 

2019 films
2010s Tamil-language films
2019 action thriller films
Indian action thriller films
Films scored by Harris Jayaraj
Cultural depictions of prime ministers of India
Films shot in Indonesia
Films shot in New York (state)
Films shot in Delhi
Films shot in Hyderabad, India
Films directed by K. V. Anand